Quirnbach is a local community belonging to an association of municipalities– in the Westerwaldkreis in Rhineland-Palatinate, Germany.

Geography 

Quirnbach is located 3 km southeast of Selters near Kleiner Saynbach in the middle of woodlands and meadowlands and belongs to Verbandsgemeinde of Selters. Its seat is in the like-named town.

History 
In 1462, Quirnbach had its first documentary mention. The name's spelling has changed over the centuries from Quirenbach to Querenbach to Quirnbach. In 1972, in the course of municipal restructuring, the Verbandsgemeinde of Selters was founded.

Politics 

The municipal council is made up of 8 council members, as well as the honorary and presiding mayor (Ortsbürgermeister), who were elected in a municipal election on 13 June 2004.

Seat apportionment on council:

Economy and infrastructure 

The nearest Autobahn interchange is Mogendorf on the A 3 (Cologne–Frankfurt). The nearest InterCityExpress stop is the railway station at Montabaur on the Cologne-Frankfurt high-speed rail line.

Personalities 
Lothar Hermann who was responsible for Detection and Arrest of Adolf Eichmann, has grown up in Quirnbach.

References

External links 
Quirnbach 
Verbandsgemeinde of Selters (Westerwald) 

Municipalities in Rhineland-Palatinate
Westerwaldkreis